Vaijayanti Gholap is Shiv Sena politician from Thane district, Maharashtra, India. She was the mayor of Kalyan-Dombivli Municipal Corporation from 2010 to 2013. She has been elected to Kalyan-Dombivali Municipal Corporation for five consecutive terms from 1995 to 2020.

Positions held
 1995: Elected as corporator in Kalyan-Dombivali Municipal Corporation (1st term)
 2000: Re-elected as corporator in Kalyan-Dombivali Municipal Corporation (2nd term)
 2005: Re-elected as corporator in Kalyan-Dombivali Municipal Corporation (3rd term)
 2010: Elected as corporator in Kalyan-Dombivali Municipal Corporation (4th term)
 2010: Elected as mayor of Kalyan-Dombivali Municipal Corporation 
 2015: Re-elected as corporator in Kalyan-Dombivali Municipal Corporation (5th term) 
 2017: Elected as chairman of Education Committee in Kalyan-Dombivali Municipal Corporation

References

External links
 Shivsena Home Page
 kdmc.gov.in

Mayors of places in Maharashtra
People from Kalyan-Dombivli
Living people
Marathi politicians
Shiv Sena politicians
People from Thane district
Maharashtra local politicians
Year of birth missing (living people)